This is a list of territorial authorities in New Zealand which have standing links to local communities in other countries. In most cases, the association, especially when formalised by local government, is known as "town twinning" (usually in Europe) or "sister cities" (usually in the rest of the world).

A
Ashburton

 Ashburton, England, United Kingdom
 Minamiuonuma, Japan
 Pulaski, United States
 Puyang, China

Auckland

 Brisbane, Australia
 Busan, South Korea
 Fukuoka, Japan
 Guangzhou, China
 Kakogawa, Japan
 Los Angeles, United States
 Utsunomiya, Japan
 Taichung, Taiwan

C
Christchurch

 Adelaide, Australia
 Christchurch, England, United Kingdom
 Kurashiki, Japan
 Seattle, United States
 Songpa (Seoul), South Korea
 Wuhan, China

D
Dunedin

 Edinburgh, Scotland, United Kingdom
 Otaru, Japan
 Portsmouth, United States
 Shanghai, China

G
Gisborne

 Mahina, French Polynesia
 Nonoichi, Japan
 Palm Desert, United States
 Rizhao, China

Gore
 Tamworth, Australia

H
Hamilton

 Chengdu, China
 Sacramento, United States
 Saitama, Japan
 Wuxi, China

Hastings
 Guilin, China

Hutt

 Minoh, Japan
 Taizhou, China
 Tempe, United States

I
Invercargill

 Kumagaya, Japan
 Suqian, China

M
Marlborough

 Ningxia, China
 Otari, Japan
 Tendō, Japan

Masterton

 Changchun, China
 Hatsukaichi, Japan

N
Napier

 Lianyungang, China
 Tomakomai, Japan
 Victoria, Canada

Nelson

 Eureka, United States
 Huangshi, China
 Miyazu, Japan
 Yangjiang, China

New Plymouth

 Kunming, China
 Mishima, Japan

P
Palmerston North

 Guiyang, China
 Missoula, United States

Porirua

 Blacktown, Australia
 Nishio, Japan
 Whitby, England, United Kingdom

Q
Queenstown-Lakes

 Aspen, United States
 Hangzhou, China

R
Rotorua Lakes

 Beppu, Japan
 Klamath Falls, United States
 Lake Macquarie, Australia
 Wuzhong (Suzhou), China

S
Selwyn

 Akitakata, Japan
 Coventry, United States
 Shandan, China

T
Taupo

 Hakone, Japan
 Nouméa, New Caledonia
 Suzhou, China

Tauranga

 Hitachi, Japan
 San Bernardino, United States

 Yantai, China

Timaru

 Eniwa, Japan
 Orange, Australia
 Orange, United States
 Weihai, China

U
Upper Hutt
 Mesa, United States

W
Waipa – Cambridge

 Bihoro, Japan
 Le Quesnoy, France

Wellington

 Beijing, China
 Canberra, Australia
 Çanakkale, Turkey
 Chania, Greece
 Harrogate, England, United Kingdom
 Sakai, Japan
 Sydney, Australia
 Xiamen, China

Whakatāne
 Kamagaya, Japan

Whanganui

 Nagaizumi, Japan
 Toowoomba, Australia

Whangarei
 Haikou, China

References

New Zealand
Lists of places in New Zealand
Foreign relations of New Zealand
Populated places in New Zealand